Ctenellidae is a family of ctenophores belonging to the order Cydippida. The family consists of only one genus: Ctenella Carré & Carré, 1993.

References

Tentaculata